Grow Up may refer to:
Advance in age
Progress toward psychological maturity
Grow Up (book), a 2007 book by Keith Allen
Grow Up (video game), 2016 video game

Music
Grow Up (Desperate Journalist album), 2017
Grow Up (The Queers album), 1990
Grow Up (Svoy album), 2011
Grow Up, a 2015 EP by HALO
"Grow Up" (Olly Murs song)
"Grow Up" (Paramore song)
"Grow Up" (Simple Plan song)
"Grow Up", a song by Rockwell
"Grow Up", a song from the Bratz album Rock Angelz
"Grow Up", a song by Cher Lloyd from Sticks and Stones

See also
Growing Up (disambiguation)
Grow Up, Tony Phillips, a 2013 film by Emily Hagins